Ádám Kellner (born 1 August 1986) is a professional Hungarian tennis player.

Kellner reached his highest individual ranking on the ATP Tour on 29 August 2011, when he became World No. 218. He primarily plays on the Futures circuit and the Challenger circuit.

Kellner has been a member of the Hungary Davis Cup team between 2005-2012, posting a 6–7 record in singles in 10 ties.

Tour singles titles – all levels (12)

Finals (8)

Tour doubles titles – all levels (9)

References

External links

1986 births
Living people
Hungarian male tennis players
20th-century Hungarian people
21st-century Hungarian people